Munschecker is a village in the commune of Manternach, in eastern Luxembourg.  , the village has a population of 146.

Manternach
Villages in Luxembourg